The 1956 United States presidential election in Pennsylvania took place on November 6, 1956 as part of the 1956 United States presidential election. Voters chose 32 representatives, or electors to the Electoral College, who voted for president and vice president.

Pennsylvania strongly voted for the Republican nominee, President Dwight D. Eisenhower, over the Democratic nominee, former Illinois Governor Adlai Stevenson. Pennsylvania was the home state of President Eisenhower, as he moved to the Gettysburg area after World War II. Eisenhower won Pennsylvania by a solid 13.19% margin, and carried every county except Philadelphia and four heavily unionized coal counties in the southwestern "Black Country". This result nonetheless made Pennsylvania 2.21% more Democratic than the nation-at-large.

This was the last time Pennsylvania voted for a Republican presidential candidate until Eisenhower’s running mate, Richard Nixon, won the state in his re-election bid in 1972.

Results

Results by county

See also
 List of United States presidential elections in Pennsylvania

Notes

References

Pennsylvania
1956
1956 Pennsylvania elections